Montour Run is a tributary of Fishing Creek in Columbia County, Pennsylvania. The stream's watershed has an area of approximately 4.7 square miles and is located in Montour Township, Columbia County and Cooper Township, Montour County. Minnows live in the stream.

A. Joseph Armstrong called the stream "undistinguished" and "not an impressive stream" in his book Trout Unlimited's Guide to Pennsylvania Limestone Streams.

Course

Montour Run begins in the western reaches of Montour Township, near the western edge of Columbia County. The headwaters are slightly south of U.S. Route 11 and near the community of Grovania. The stream flows east for a short distance and passes a landing strip, roughly following U.S. Route 11, before turning east-southeast and receiving an unnamed tributary from a quarry. Shortly after receiving the tributary, it turns east-northeast and then east. After a short distance, it turns northeast, continuing to follow U.S. Route 11. The stream passes through a pond and crosses under Pennsylvania Route 42 before turning east-southeast and reaching its confluence with Fishing Creek near Rupert.

Hydrology
A 28.2% reduction in the load would be required for the stream to meet the Pennsylvania Department of Environmental Protection's standards.

No sediment in the watershed comes from wetlands.

Most of the streams in the watershed of Montour Run do not meet the Pennsylvania Department of Environmental Protection's water quality standards, but a tributary in the northwestern reaches of the watershed do meet the standards.

The stream has a high water temperature.

Geography and geology

The watershed of Montour Run is located in the ridge and valley physiographic region of the Appalachian Mountains.

50 percent of the rock in the watershed of Montour Run is shale 25 percent is sandstone, 20 percent is interbedded sedimentary rock. The remaining 5 percent is carbonate rock. The Mahantango Formation is found in the lower reaches of the Montour Run watershed, as is the Marcellus Formation. Both of these formations are from the Middle Devonian.

95 percent of the soil in the Montour Run watershed is in the hydrologic soil group B, while 5 percent is in the hydrologic soil group C.

The banks of the stream experience erosion.

Watershed

The watershed of Montour Run has an area of approximately 4.7 square miles. The watershed is in Montour Township, as well as Cooper Township, in Montour County. Agricultural land, including cropland, hay, and pastures, makes up 45.7% of the land in the watershed and forests make up 40.5% of the land. 13.1% of the land is classified as "low-intensity development" by the Pennsylvania Department of Environmental Protection and 0.7% of the watershed is wetland.

Hay and pastures occupy 800.6 acres of the watershed of Montour Run and 538.7 acres of the watershed are occupied by cropland.

There are NWI wetlands and steep slopes on the lower reaches of Montour Run.

History
Montour Run is named after Madame Montour.

A stone arch bridge was built over the stream near Bloomsburg in 1880 and it underwent repair in 1927.

Biology
Montour Run is considered by the Pennsylvania Department of Environmental Protection to be a coldwater fishery. The only fish living in the stream are minnows.

The riparian buffer is limited in some places along Montour Run. Conservation farming is not practiced in the upper reaches of the watershed.

See also
Hemlock Creek
List of rivers of Pennsylvania

References

Rivers of Columbia County, Pennsylvania
Tributaries of Fishing Creek (North Branch Susquehanna River)
Rivers of Pennsylvania